The , or  for short, is a private,  narrow gauge railway company operating the Kurobe Gorge Main Line along the Kurobe River in the Kurobe gorge area of Toyama Prefecture, Japan. The railway was built to serve the construction of the Kurobe dam for the Kansai Electric Power Company, which was completed in 1963; Kurotetsu was spun off from the power company in June 1971, but remains a wholly owned subsidiary. At its terminus, the Main Line links to Kurobe Senyō Railway, which is not open to general public.

In 2008 the company operated 27 locomotives, 138 passenger carriages and 322 freight wagons.

History
The Unazuki - Nekomata section opened in 1926, electrified at 600 VDC and was extended to Keyakidaira in 1937.

The passenger service started in 1953.

Stations 
All stations are in Kurobe, Toyama.

Key
●: Served by passenger trains
▲: Served by passenger trains only during April–May
｜: Closed to passengers

Equipment

Electric locomotives 
 EB class (Nos. 1–3, 5–7): withdrawn from service in 1984.
 ED class (Nos. 8–11): 9–11 survive.
 EDS class (Nos. 13, 15–17): No. 13 survives.
 EDM class (Nos. 22, 23, 30–32)
 EDR class (Nos. 17–21, 24–29, 33)
 EHR class (Nos. 101, 102)

Battery electric locomotives 
 BB class (Nos. 1, 2)

Diesel locomotives 
 DB class (No. 11): withdrawn 1985
 DD21: withdrawn 1979
 DD22, DD23: DD23 withdrawn 2000
 DD24

Passenger cars 
  class: 2-axle open car.
 1000 class: open car
 2000 class: heated car with fixed, widthwise seats, extra charge to ride
 2500 class: heated car with reversible seats so that passengers can always ride facing forward, extra charge to ride
 2800 class: lounge car, heated, reversible seats, extra charge to ride
 3000 class: panoramic observation car, extra charge to ride

The cars are manufactured by Alna Koki. The 2000 class cars have drivers cabs at their front end.

Freight cars 

  class (boxcar)
  class depressed center flatcar
  class flatcar
  class flatcar
  class flatcar
  class gondola
  class gondola
  class flatcar
  class depressed center flatcar

See also
 List of railway lines in Japan

References
This article incorporates material from the corresponding article in the Japanese Wikipedia

External links

 

Railway companies established in 1971
Railway companies of Japan
Companies based in Toyama Prefecture
2 ft 6 in gauge railways in Japan
Japanese companies established in 1971
Kurobe, Toyama